Cymmer is a small village in the community of Clymer and Glyncorrwg, in Neath Port Talbot in Wales, set on a hillside in the Afan Valley near the confluence of the River Afan and the River Corrwg. In 2001, Cymmer had a population of 2,883.

Description
Cymmer can also be spelled "Cymer", with "Cymmer" being the English-language version, and "Cymer" the Welsh language one. The word "Cymmer" translates from Welsh into English as "joining place of two rivers", and it is here that the Afon Corrwg and the Afon Afan meet, to flow onward as the River Afan until entering the sea at Aberavon/Port Talbot.

The immediate area is set in a densely forested upland area with steep sided river valleys cut through by the Rivers Afan and Corrwg. Patches of open moorland exist to the north and south.

Social conditions
The Cymmer electoral ward was one of the top 10% most deprived wards in Wales according to the 2005 Welsh Index of Multiple Deprivation.

Amenities 
Local public houses include The Refreshment Rooms (the preserved Rhondda and Swansea Bay Railway station) and a working men's club called The Coronation Club. Local amenities include a library, a community swimming pool, a sports hall, primary school, a police station and fire station.

Government and politics
Cymmer is also the name of the electoral ward for the immediate area around the village. It elects a county councillor to Neath Port Talbot County Borough Council. The ward includes some or all of the villages of Cymmer, Abercregan, Duffryn and Croeserw in the parliamentary constituency of Aberavon. Cymmer is bounded by the wards of Resolven to the north; Glyncorrwg to the northeast; Gwynfi to the east; Blaengarw, Caerau and Maesteg West of Bridgend county borough to the south east; Bryn and Cwmavon to the southwest; and Pelenna to the west.

In the 2008 local council elections, the electorate turnout was 48.23%.  The results were:

Only one nomination was received for the 2012 Local Council Elections, from the sitting councillor Scott Jones. Jones continued to be the councillor of Cymmer without a contest.

In the 2017 local council elections, the results were:

In July 2018, Councillor Scott Jones resigned the Labour whip.  He therefore now sits as an independent.

References

External links
www.geograph.co.uk : photos of Cymer and surrounding area

Villages in Neath Port Talbot
Electoral wards of Neath Port Talbot
Afan Valley